Cecidochares connexa is a species of tephritid or fruit flies in the genus Cecidochares of the family Tephritidae. It is used for biocontrol of invasive shrub Chromolaena odorata.

Distribution
Venezuela, Argentina, Brazil.

References

Tephritinae
Insects described in 1848
Diptera of South America
[[Category:Taxa named by Pierre-Justin-Marie Macquart]